Attention inequality is a term used to denote the inequality of distribution of attention across users on social networks, people in general, and for scientific papers. Yun Family Foundation introduced "Attention Inequality Coefficient" as a measure of inequality in attention and arguments it by the close interconnection with wealth inequality.

Relationship to economic inequality

Attention inequality is related to economic inequality since attention is an economically scarce good. Same measures and concepts as in classical economy can be applied for attention economy. The relationship develops also beyond the conceptual level — considering the AIDA process, attention is the prerequisite for real monetary income on the Internet. On data of 2018, a significant relationship between likes and comments on Facebook to donations is proven for non-profit organizations.

Extent

As data of 2008 shows, 50% of the attention is concentrated on approximately 0.2% of all hostnames, and 80% on 5% of hostnames. The Gini coefficient of attention distribution lay in 2008 at over 0.921 for such commercial domains names as ac.jp and at 0.985 for .org-domains.

The Gini coefficient was measured on Twitter in 2016 for the number of followers as 0.9412, for the number of mentions as 0.9133, and for the number of retweets as 0.9034. For comparison, the world's income Gini coefficient was 0.68 in 2005 and 0.904 in 2018. More than 96% of all followers, 93% of the retweets, and 93% of all mentions are owned by 20% of Twitter.

Causes

At least for scientific papers, today's consensus states that inequality is unexplainable by variations of quality and individual talent. Matthew effect plays a significant role in the emergence of attention inequality — those, who already enjoy a lot of attention, get even more attention and those who do not, lose even more. Significant evidence could be found that ranking algorithm would alleviate the inequality of number of posts across topics.

Remedy

Government by algorithm is suggested to tackle the problem of attention inequality.

See also
Attention economy
Cumulative advantage
Cumulative inequality theory
Famous for being famous
Kardashian index
Knowledge gap hypothesis
Ortega hypothesis
Pareto distribution

External links
 Attention inequality by Yun Family Foundation

References

Social media
Attention
Popularity
Social influence
Social inequality
Cognitive biases
Economic inequality
Information Age
Matthew effect